Tarpurchandi is a village in Tarpurchandi Union of Chandpur Sadar Upazila, Chandpur District, Bangladesh. It is situated near the town of Chandpur.

References

Chandpur District